Ankita Lokhande Jain (born 19 December 1984) is an Indian actress who debuted in an award-winning role in Balaji Telefilms's daily show Pavitra Rishta on Zee TV.
She was one of the highest paid television actors until she retired in 2018 to foray into films. Lokhande has also starred in the Bollywood films Baaghi 3 and Manikarnika: The Queen of Jhansi.

Life and career

Early life and career (1984–2005)
Lokhande was born on 19 December 1984, in a Marathi family in Indore to her mother Vandana Phadnis Lokhande, a teacher, and her father Shashikant Lokhande. She also has two brothers Sooraj and Arun, and a sister Jyoti. After graduating she moved to Mumbai in 2005 to pursue a career in acting.

Rise to stardom and personal life (2009–2016)

After participation in India's Best Cinestars Ki Khoj (2004–05), Lokhande won the lead role of Archana in Ekta Kapoor's daily soap Pavitra Rishta (2009–14).

She participated in Jhalak Dikhhla Jaa 4 and Comedy Circus and did an episodic for Ek Thi Naayka.

Pavitra Rishta took a generation leap in 2013, and Lokhande also began playing Archana's granddaughter Ankita, along with her former role of Archana, until the series ended in 2014.

Lokhande co-starred with Sushant Singh Rajput in Pavitra Rishta, and they began dating in 2010, Rajput proposed her in the dance reality show Jhalak Dikhlaja 4. In a 2016 interview, the couple even spoke of marrying each other. However the same year couple parted their ways.

Film and web series debut (2017–2021)
After a two-year gap from acting and her separation from Rajput, there were reports that Lokhande was set for a movie debut with a role in Sanjay Leela Bhansali's period drama Padmaavat (2018). However she left the movie, replying that she was not ready for film.

The following year, speculation spread that she had been signed for Girish Malik's film Torbaaz along with Sanjay Dutt. However,  rumours proved to be untrue after Malik stated that Lokhande was not going to be involved with the film.

In 2018, she announced she would appear in the role of Jhalkaribai, a warrior in Krish and Kangana Ranaut's joint directorial venture Manikarnika: The Queen of Jhansi, an epic drama based on the life of Rani Lakshmi Bai. The film received a theatrical premiere during the eve of Republic Day 2019 and did quite very well at the box-office, becoming her first commercial success.

Lokhande next starred in Sajid Nadiadwala's action packed production Baaghi 3 (2020), the third part of the Baaghi trilogy, alongside Tiger Shroff, Shraddha Kapoor and Riteish Deshmukh, in the role of Kapoor's elder sister married to Deshmukh's character. The film was released prior to the shut down of theatres owing to COVID-19 pandemic in India, which affected the box office performance.

In 2021 she reprised her role as Archana in web series Pavitra Rishta 2.0 along with Shaheer Sheikh.

Marriage and further (2021–present)

In 2019, she announced her relationship with Vicky Jain, a businessman. They married on 14 December 2021 in Mumbai. In February 2022, she participated in StarPlus' Smart Jodi with her husband, Vicky Jain, subsequently becoming the winner of Season 1.

Television

Films

Web series

Accolades

References

External links

 
 

Living people
Place of birth missing (living people)
Indian soap opera actresses
Indian film actresses
1984 births
Actresses in Hindi cinema
Actresses in Hindi television
Indian television actresses